Jefferson County R-VII School District is a school district located in Jefferson County, Missouri serving Festus, Missouri and Plattin, Missouri.

About
Jefferson County R-VII School District had a graduation rate of 100% in the 2016-2017 School Year. 71% of graduates go on to attend college. 93% of the student body is of Caucasian ancestry. 33% of students are eligible for free or reduced price lunch.

List of schools

Pre-K 
Jefferson County R-VII Pre School

Elementary schools 
Plattin Elementary

Middle schools 
Danby Rush-Tower Middle 
Telegraph Intermediate

High schools 
Jefferson High

References

 Buildings and structures in Jefferson County, Missouri
 Education in Jefferson County, Missouri